The Libera San Marino (Libera) is a political party in San Marino, founded on 14 November 2020.

History
Originating as a coalition of parties on 14 October 2019, Libero won third place in the 2019 San Marino general election and became the largest parliamentary opposition force in the Grand and General Council. The component member parties of the coalition – namely the Democratic Socialist Left, Civic 10, Socialist Ideals Movement and Reforms and Development – merged into a unitary party on 14 November 2020.

Electoral history

References

Political parties established in 2019
Political parties in San Marino
Democratic socialist parties in Europe